The 2022–23 Villanova Wildcats men's basketball team represented Villanova University in the 2022–23 NCAA Division I men's basketball season. Led by head coach Kyle Neptune in his first year as a head coach, the Wildcats played their home games at the Finneran Pavilion on the school's campus in the Philadelphia suburb of Villanova, Pennsylvania and Wells Fargo Center as members of the Big East Conference. They finished with a record of 16–15, 10–10 to tie for sixth place in regular conference play. In the 2023 Big East Tournament, they defeated Georgetown in the opening round before losing to Creighton in the quarterfinals. The Wildcats received an at-large bit to the NIT, losing in the first round to Liberty.

Previous season
The Wildcats finished the 2021–22 season 30–8, 16–4 in Big East play to finish in second place. They defeated St. John's, UConn, and Creighton to win the Big East tournament championship. As a result, they received the conference's automatic bid to the NCAA tournament as the No. 2 seed in the South region. They defeated Delaware, Ohio State, Michigan, and Houston to advance to the Final Four. There they lost to eventual national champion Kansas.

On April 20, 2022, head coach Jay Wright announced he was retiring effective immediately. Former Wright assistant and Fordham head coach Kyle Neptune was named the team's new head coach.

Offseason

Departures

2022 recruiting class

Roster

Schedule and results

|-
!colspan=12 style=| Non-conference regular season

|-
!colspan=12 style=| Big East regular season

|-
!colspan=12 style=| Big East tournament

|-
!colspan=12 style=| NIT tournament

Source

Rankings

*AP does not release post-NCAA Tournament rankings

References 

Villanova Wildcats basketball
Villanova
2022 in sports in Pennsylvania
2023 in sports in Pennsylvania
Villanova